Jafarbay may refer to:
 Jafarbay, Golestan
 Jafarbay-ye Gharbi Rural District
 Jafarbay-ye Jonubi Rural District
 Jafarbay-ye Sharqi Rural District